Lake Pomorie (Pomoriysko ezero) is the northernmost of the coastal Burgas Lakes, located in the immediate proximity of the Black Sea and the Bulgarian town of Pomorie. It has an area of 8.5 km2 (reaching 10 km2 together with the adjacent damp zones) and has an elongated shape with a length of 6.7 km and width of 1.8–2 km. Divided from the sea by a narrow strip of sand (spit) and an artificial dike, the lake is an ultrasaline natural lagoon.

Lake Pomorie is a protected area since January 2001. Sea salt is obtained in the north part and curative mud in the south. Located on the Via Pontica bird migration route, the lake is inhabited by 215 species of birds, 4 of which globally endangered, and is thus of ornithological importance.

References

Pomorie
Pomorie
Pomorie
Landforms of Burgas Province
Ramsar sites in Bulgaria